The 2007–08 Bill Beaumont Cup (Rugby Union County Championship) was the 108th edition of England's County Championship rugby union club competition. 

Yorkshire won their 15th title after defeating Devon in the final.

Final

See also
 English rugby union system
 Rugby union in England

References

Rugby Union County Championship
County Championship (rugby union) seasons